Alf "Jasper" Geddes (born 1871 in West Bromwich and died 1927) was an English footballer who played as an outside left. He made over 70 Football League and 130 Southern League appearances in the years before the First World War.

Career
Jasper Geddes played locally for Causeway Green Villa before joining West Bromwich Albion and playing for three seasons in the First Division; West Bromwich also won the FA Cup in 1892 during this period. Geddes then moved south via Clapton Rovers to Millwall to play in the Southern League. Geddes had second spells with firstly, West Bromwich Albion, in the Football League for one season during which West Brom were FA Cup runners up. Then secondly returning to Millwall in the Southern League for four seasons including 1896-97 when he had his most successful scoring season with 12 goals.

Geddes finished his career in Bristol playing in the Southern League in successive seasons for three Bristol clubs. Sam Hollis signed Geddes in July 1899 from Millwall for Bedminster and Geddes moved to Bristol City in the following summer when Bedminster merged with Bristol City.
Geddes played a final season in 1901–02 with Bristol Rovers.

Honours
Millwall
Southern Football League champions: 1894–95, 1895–96

West Bromwich Albion
FA Cup: 1891–92

References

1871 births
1927 deaths
Sportspeople from West Bromwich
English footballers
Association football wingers
English Football League players
Southern Football League players
West Bromwich Albion F.C. players
Millwall F.C. players
Bedminster F.C. players
Bristol City F.C. players
Bristol Rovers F.C. players
FA Cup Final players